The duodenojejunal flexure or duodenojejunal junction is the border between the duodenum and the jejunum.

Structure
The ascending portion of the duodenum ascends on the left side of the aorta, as far as the level of the upper border of the second lumbar vertebra. At this point, it turns abruptly forward to merge with the jejunum, forming the duodenojejunal flexure. This forms the beginning of the jejunum. The duodenojejunal flexure is surrounded by the suspensory muscle of the duodenum. It is retroperitoneal, so is less mobile than the jejunum that comes after it, helping to stabilise the jejunum.

The duodenojejunal flexure lies in front of the left psoas major muscle, the left renal artery, and the left renal vein. It is covered in front, and partly at the sides, by peritoneum continuous with the left portion of the mesentery.

Clinical significance
The ligament of Treitz, a peritoneal fold, from the right crus of diaphragm, is an identification point for the duodenojejunal flexure during abdominal surgery.

Additional images

See also

 Duodenum
 Transpyloric plane

References

External links
  - "The large intestine."
  - "Intestines and Pancreas: The Duodenum"
 

Digestive system